is a creature illustrated in Toriyama Sekien's Konjaku Hyakki Shūi.

Mythology
It resembles a small dog covered entirely in long hair. Its name is a pun - when written with different kanji, keukegen means "an unusual thing which is rarely seen".

According to one report, the keukegen is a disease spirit which lives in damp, dark places and causes people in the house to get sick.

References
 
 Mizuki Road: Keukegen
 CSK: Hyakki Yagyō: Keukegen
 Japanese Wikipedia: Keukegen

Yōkai